Uninvited is a horror-themed point-and-click adventure game developed originally for the Macintosh by ICOM Simulations released in 1986 by Mindscape.

The game uses the MacVenture engine that was introduced in ICOM's prior game, Deja Vu: a Nightmare Comes True.

Plot

The unnamed hero must find the way through an abandoned house in order to rescue a sibling. The quest involves magic and solving logic puzzles while discovering sinister secrets of the house's former inhabitants.

The player regains consciousness from a car crash in front of a large, old mansion. The player's sibling (a younger brother in the PC versions but an older sister in the NES version) is gone, and the car is soon lost, as it bursts into flames. The only option is to enter the mansion looking for the lost sibling. It is not long before the player is greeted by the first undead dweller.

It gradually becomes evident that the house once belonged to a sorcerer with a number of apprentices. Dracan, the most talented apprentice, became corrupt and killed the other inhabitants with his magic, resulting in the house becoming haunted.

Gameplay

The main house consists of two floors and a tower, most parts being in early 20th century style. Some rooms (e.g. the servant's bedroom) have newer decor. No help is to be found, as there is not a single living person inhabiting the house.

Aside from the house, there are three backyard buildings to explore: the observatory, where some of the final events take place; the greenhouse, which is not as infertile as it first seems; and the chapel, which leads into a cemetery maze. Several places are guarded by magical creatures, including apparitions, hellhounds, and zombies, as well as some more unconventional entities; one is a tiny demon that flies by periodically, holding a key.

There is also an art gallery room hidden in the house. To access the room, the player has to collect two lamps from a fireplace, and click on an odd dot on a painting in a study room. The player will then be teleported to a room containing paintings and sculptures. A door in the art gallery room brings the player to the hall of the observatory. Accessing the art gallery is possible in all versions of Uninvited except those on the Commodore 64 and NES.

The quest to rescue the player's sibling is mostly a matter of gaining access to the locked or guarded parts of the estate. As in the other MacVenture games, there is a time limit. But unlike a regular time limit that is based on seconds or minutes, the time limit in Uninvited is based on moves (a move is defined as either speaking to a character, entering a room, observing an object, or using an item). If the player runs out of moves, the evil presence of the mansion takes control, and the player eventually ends up as a zombie. This element is partially absent from the NES version, as it is instead caused by a useless item that may be avoided. Since the story largely revolves around magic, many of the game's puzzles seem illogical. Hints for these and bits of the background story are unraveled in the various diaries and scrolls found within the grounds. Still, because the gameplay is very non-linear, the ending is somewhat abrupt.

NES version
 In the NES version, if the player uses the phonograph in the Game room (Rec room in original versions), a broken-record version of the main theme from Shadowgate, another NES-ported game in the MacVenture series, will play. (A similar gag appears in another point-and-click game, Maniac Mansion).
 The sibling trapped in the mansion is changed from a younger brother to an older sister in the NES version.
 The NES version has no time limit unless the player picks up the ruby in one of the bedrooms. Even then, the player can drop the ruby to terminate the time limit.
 As with the other NES ports, the game texts were severely simplified, in some cases also adding hints or elucidations for the gameplay. As an example, a hallway picture reads as follows in the NES version: "It's a small,  painting of a young fellow."
 In the original game, the address was, "Master Crowley, 666 Blackwell Road, Loch Ness, Scotland". However, at the time the game was released, Nintendo of America had stringent policy necessitating the removal of any remotely offensive material. Rather than create a new address, it was simply shortened to "Master Crowley". This is likely a reference to occultist Aleister Crowley, but Nintendo (perhaps unknowingly) allowed the name to remain in the game. Other changes that may relate to censorship issues are pentagrams turned into stars (or, in one case, a ruby) and a cross into a chalice (while another cross that only served as decoration was removed altogether).
 Beyond the game texts being simplified for the NES port, some of the death texts were edited or altered due to their rather graphic descriptions.
 When performing magic, instead of the typing magic words on a keyboard, the player simply has to scroll through his/her inventory before selecting the words.

The NES version was released for PlayStation 4 and Xbox One in a package called "8-Bit Adventure Anthology".

Reception
German magazine Data Welt praised the Amiga version's user-friendliness, good graphics and particularly the atmospheric sound, calling the game (translated): "excellent" and "even better than Deja Vu". Computer Gaming World found the game to be enjoyable and innovative, praising the game's use of graphics and almost exclusive use of the mouse as a way of eliminating frustration. As such, the game was described as "much easier to work with than pure text or text and graphic adventure games." Dragon complimented the game, calling it "a truly horrifying adventure game and mystery that’ll leave you shivering in the dark". Compute! liked Uninviteds "fluid interface, solid logical puzzles, and something's-around-the-corner feel". Video Games: The Ultimate Gaming Magazine gave the Windows version 8 out of 10.

Trivia

See also
The Legacy: Realm of Terror

References

External links

Uninvited at Interactive Fiction Database

1986 video games
1980s horror video games
Amiga games
Apple IIGS games
Atari ST games
Commodore 64 games
DOS games
First-person adventure games
ICOM Simulations games
Classic Mac OS games
Nintendo Entertainment System games
Point-and-click adventure games
Video games developed in the United States
Windows games
PlayStation 4 games
Xbox One games
Single-player video games
Works set in country houses
Mindscape games
Video games set in Scotland